(KAIT) is a private university in Atsugi, Kanagawa Prefecture, Japan.

The predecessor of the school, a vocational school, was founded in 1963. It was chartered as a university in 1975. The present name was adopted in 1988.

Abstract

The university has a campus at the middle of Kanagawa prefecture, Atsugi city.

The Bachelor program has 5 faculties and 13 departments. The departments are: Faculty of Engineering (Department of Mechanical Engineering, Department of Electrical, Electronic and Computer Engineering, Department of Applied Chemistry, Department of Clinical Engineering), Faculty of Creative Engineering (Department of Automotive Systems Development Engineering, Department of Robotics and Mechatronics, Department of Home Electronics Development), Faculty of Applied Bio-Science (Department of Applied Bioscience, Department of Nutrition and Life Science), Faculty of Informatics (Department of Information Engineering, Department of Information Network and Communication, Department of Information Media), and Faculty of Nursing (Department of Nursing). Department of Information Network and Communication, Department of Information Media), and the Faculty of Nursing (Department of Nursing).

Graduate School includes the Graduate School of Engineering (Master's and Doctoral Programs in Mechanical Engineering, Electrical and Electronic Engineering, Applied Chemistry and Bioscience, Mechanical Systems Engineering, and Information Technology, as well as the Master's Program in Robotics and Mechatronics).

The number of students, including graduate students, is approximately 5,000.

Graduate school 
 Graduate School of Engineering
 Department of Mechanical Engineering（Master's Course, Doctoral Course） 
 Department of Electrical and Electronic Engineering（Master's Course, Doctoral Course） 
 Department of Applied Chemistry and Bioscience（Master's Course, Doctoral Course） 
 Department of Mechanical Systems Engineering（Master's Course, Doctoral Course）
 Department of Information Engineering（Master's Course, Doctoral Course）
 Department of Robotics and Mechatronics Systems（Master's Course）

Education

Special Department 
developed for foreign student 
Japanese Language Training Course

Student Life

International Exchange
In 2006, the International Office was renovated and a new lounge was opened in a renovated classroom. However, the space was too small and was filled with international students and current students at lunchtime, so the lounge was moved to a larger space in spring 2007. In September 2006, the Special Department program for international students was established. In September 2006, the International Student Special Department Program was established, and at the same time, the International Club was established under the direct control of the International Affairs Division to promote exchange between current students and international students.

The International Office serves as the contact point for university-sponsored language training twice a year: in February at University of Washington in United States (4 weeks) and in August at Edith Cowan University in Australia (3 weeks). In addition to the language training in August, some of the programs in February are unique programs in specialized fields, such as overseas mechanical engineering training and overseas bioengineering training, where students can learn specialized skills while studying the language. In addition to language training, there are also overseas mechanical engineering training and overseas bioengineering training programs. Anyone, regardless of department, can participate.

Employment
Of the students who apply for employment, the job offer rate is 98.7% (2005). The percentage of students who go on to higher education is 13.1% (2005).

The Faculty of Engineering and the Faculty of Informatics have Curator programs.

Facilities
Annex Library
Institute for Advanced Technology
KAIT Workshop
Mechanical and Electrical Electronics Research Building
Flight Simulator Lab.
Applied Chemistry Research Building
Automotive System Development Research Building
Design Studio
Robotics and Mechatronics Research Building
Life Model Room
Applied Bioscience Research Building
Bioscience Center
Nutritionist Training Facility
Engineering Education and Research Building
Nanotechnology Laboratory
Chemistry Laboratory
Automotive Engineering Building
Driving Simulator Room
Robotics and Project Building
Exhibition Room
Electrical and Chemical Laboratory Building
Circuit Design Education Center
HEMS Certification Support Center
Nursing and Medical Care Building
Student cafeteria
1st Cafeteria(Ginza Suehiro)
2nd Cafeteria (Kanagawa Institute of Technology Planning)
[Cafeteria 2] (Kanagawa Institute of Technology)
[Cafeteria No.3] (Kanagawa Institute of Technology Planning)
McDonald's at Kanagawa Institute of Technology
Cafeteria (also known as the fourth cafeteria)

Some of the seating in the second cafeteria is outdoors on the terrace.

Exercise facilities
There is a baseball stadium called "KAIT Stadium", which is equipped with nighttime facilities and an electronic bulletin board. It also appears in the movie version of ROOKIES as "Tama Sports University".

External Relations 
 The Open University of Japan - Credit transfer agreement signed
 Private Engineering and Technology Association - Mutual library use agreement
 Western Tokyo Metropolitan University Credit Transfer Agreement
 Kanagawa Prefecture Graduate School Academic Exchange Agreement
 Academic Exchange Agreement with Dongseo University
 Kanagawa Prefecture Graduate School Academic Exchange Agreement concluded with Dongseo University.
 Kanagawa Prefectural Industrial Technology Research Institute (KISTEC) - Comprehensive Collaborative Agreement

 Partner universities for training implementation (partner universities that offer language and specialized field training, study abroad programs, etc.)
 State University of Washington
 South Seattle Community College
 Green River Community College
 DigiPen Institute of Technology
 Lake Washington Institute of Technology
 Oxford Brookes University
 Yangzhou University
 Ming Tao University
 Science Partnership Program - Cooperation with each high school based on the "Science Partnership Program Project", which is part of the "Science and Technology and Science Love Plan" promoted by the Ministry of Education, Culture, Sports, Science and Technology.

References

External links
 Official website 

 

Educational institutions established in 1975
Private universities and colleges in Japan
Universities and colleges in Kanagawa Prefecture
Engineering universities and colleges in Japan
Western Metropolitan Area University Association